Tamo Campos is a professional snowboarder and noted environmentalist from British Columbia, Canada.

He is the founder of the humanitarian group Beyond Boarding. In 2022, he directed the documentary film The Klabona Keepers, about the Tahltan First Nation's successful activist campaign against industrial development that would have impacted the Sacred Headwaters, or Klabona, in northern British Columbia.

Campos is the grandson of David Suzuki.

References

Canadian male snowboarders
Living people
Sportspeople from British Columbia
Year of birth missing (living people)
Canadian documentary film directors
Asian-Canadian filmmakers
Film directors from British Columbia